COOKFOX Architects (formerly Cook+Fox Architects) is a firm of architects founded by Rick Cook and Robert F. Fox, Jr. in 2003. The firm works on both new projects and on the adaptive reuse of existing buildings. COOKFOX is best known for designing the Bank of America Tower at One Bryant Park.

Work
The firm’s portfolio includes commercial, institutional and residential projects. COOKFOX has completed multiple projects in New York City’s historic Landmarks districts. Works include the redevelopment of Historic Front Street, a revitalization of a 19th-century neighborhood that won an AIA-NY/Boston Society of Architects Honor Award for Housing Design; 401 W 14th Street, a mixed-use building in Manhattan’s Meatpacking District that won an AIA-NY State Award for Adaptive Reuse; and the redevelopment of Henry Miller’s Theatre, a newly constructed theater with a Landmarked 1918 façade that will receive LEED Gold certification, making it Broadway’s first green theater. Recent projects, notably the Bank of America Tower and Henry Miller’s Theatre (renamed the Stephen Sondheim Theatre), focus on creating a healthy workplace. In 2009, the firm was completing construction on the LiveWorkHome, a green, affordable home in Syracuse, NY that was one of three winning entries in the “From the Ground Up” Competition. It was also completing the Center for Friends Without a Border, a visitors’ center at the Angkor Hospital for Children in Siem Reap, Cambodia.

The firm itself has won awards including the Museum of the City of New York’s Gotham Giant Award and New York School of Interior Design’s inaugural Honor Roll of Green Design Award. COOKFOX’s LEED Platinum office – the first LEED Platinum project in New York State – is located in Manhattan’s Chelsea neighborhood. The office’s interior was restored and the firm built a green roof, which was featured in National Geographic’s May 2009 issue.

References

External links 
COOKFOX Architects, DPC

Architecture in New York (state)
Architecture firms based in New York City
2003 establishments in New York City
Design companies established in 2003